Bruno Henrique Cappelozza (born May 20, 1989) is a Brazilian mixed martial artist currently signed to the Professional Fighters League, where he competes in the heavyweight division. He is the 2021 PFL heavyweight world champion.

Cappelozza has also competed in MMA promotions Rizin Fighting Federation and Jungle Fight.

Early life 
Cappelozza was born in Jaú, São Paulo, Brazil, where he first began to train in mixed martial arts.

Mixed martial arts career 
Cappelozza made his professional mixed martial arts debut in 2010, fighting for an MMA team owned by Brazilian soccer team Sport Club Corinthians Paulista, commonly called Corinthians. At Corinithians, Cappelozza trained with former Ultimate Fighting Championship middleweight champion Anderson Silva. Following Corinthians, Cappelozza competed in promotions such as Predador FC, Jungle Fight, and Rizin.

Cappelozza faced future UFC Light Heavyweight champion Jiří Procházka on July 28, 2018, at Rizin 11. He lost the fight via knockout in the first round.

Professional Fighters League

2021 Season 
In 2020, Cappelozza signed with the Professional Fighters League and made his debut in the 2021 season.

Cappelozza debuted at PFL 3, scoring a 46-second KO of Ante Delija. He knocked out Muhammad DeReese in the first round of his next fight at PFL 6 to secure the No.1 seed in the 2021 PFL Playoffs.

In the Semifinals at PFL 8, Cappelozza stopped Jamelle Jones via second-round TKO to earn a place in the finals, opposite Delija, in a rematch from the 2021 PFL Regular Season.

In the PFL heavyweight championship bout at PFL 10, a back-and-forth battle with multiple knockdowns, Cappelozza defeated Delija by unanimous decision to become the 2021 PFL Heavyweight Champion.

Immediately following Cappelozza's championship win, he learned via phone that his father, Joao Cappelozza, died three days prior to the PFL Championship. His family withheld the information so he wouldn't be distracted while preparing for the fight.

2022 Season 
Cappelozza launched 2022 season with a fight against Stuart Austin at PFL 2, which Cappeloza won in the first round with a knockout.

In June 2022, at PFL 5, Matheus Scheffel defeated Cappelozza via unanimous decision, in a surprising upset. Despite that loss, Cappelozza still advanced to the playoffs, due to his earlier KO. That fight was nominated for “Upset of the Year” in the World MMA Awards.

In July 2022, ESPN reported that Cappelozza would no longer compete in the PFL playoffs due to an undisclosed injury. He was replaced by Mattheus Scheffel in the semifinal fight against Denis Goltsov.

2023 Season 
Cappelozza will start off the 2023 PFL season in a rematch against Matheus Scheffel on April 7, 2023, at PFL 2.

Championships and accomplishments

Mixed martial arts 

 Professional Fighters League
 2021 PFL Heavyweight Championship

Mixed martial arts record

|-
|Loss
|align=center|15–6
|Matheus Scheffel
|Decision (unanimous)
|PFL 5
|
|align=center|3
|align=center|5:00
|Atlanta, Georgia, United States
|
|-
|Win
|align=center|15–5
|Stuart Austin
|TKO (punches)
|PFL 2
|
|align=center|1
|align=center|4:24
|Arlington, Texas, United States
|
|-
|Win
|align=center|14–5
|Ante Delija
|Decision (unanimous)
|PFL 10 
|
|align=center|5
|align=center|5:00
|Hollywood, Florida, United States
|
|-
|Win
|align=center|13–5
|Jamelle Jones
|TKO (punches)
|PFL 8 
|
|align=center|2
|align=center|1:33
|Hollywood, Florida, United States
|
|-
|Win
|align=center| 12–5
| Muhammed DeReese
| TKO (punch and head kick)
| PFL 6
| 
|align=center| 1
|align=center| 2:21
|Atlantic City, New Jersey, United States 
|
|-
|Win
|align=center| 11–5
| Ante Delija
| KO (punches)
| PFL 3
| 
|align=center| 1
|align=center| 0:46
| Atlantic City, New Jersey, United States 
|
|-
|Loss
|align=center| 10–5
|Jiří Procházka
| KO (punches)
| Rizin 11
| 
| align=center|1
| align=center|1:23
| Saitama, Japan
|
|-
|Win
|align=center| 10–4
| Lucas Rosa
| TKO (punches)
| Gladiator MMA 3
| 
|align=center| 1
|align=center| 3:02
| São Paulo, Brazil
|
|-
|Win
|align=center| 9–4
|Devani Martins Jr.
| TKO (knee and punches)
| Demolidor Fight 10
| 
|align=center| 1
|align=center| 0:07
| São Paulo, Brazil
|
|-
|Win
|align=center| 8–4
| Klidson Abreu
| TKO (punches)
|Jungle Fight 87
| 
|align=center| 3
|align=center| 3:08
| São Paulo, Brazil
|
|-
|Loss
|align=center| 7–4
|Teodoras Aukštuolis
|KO (punch)
|Rizin World Grand Prix 2015: Part 1 - Saraba
|
|align=center|1
|align=center|3:32
|Saitama, Japan
|
|-
|Win
|align=center| 7–3
|Sandro Bezerra
| TKO (punches)
|Jungle Fight 82
| 
|align=center| 1
|align=center| 4:17
| São Paulo, Brazil
|
|-
|Win
|align=center| 6–3
|Marco Talebi Paulo
| KO (punches)
| Gladiator MMA 2
| 
|align=center| 1
|align=center| 0:20
| São Paulo, Brazil
|
|-
|Win
|align=center| 5–3
|David Teixeira
| TKO
| Gladiator MMA
| 
|align=center| 2
|align=center| N/A
| São Paulo, Brazil
|
|-
|Win
|align=center| 4–3
|Vagner Curió
| TKO (punches)
| Real Fight 9
| 
|align=center| 1
|align=center| N/A
| São Paulo, Brazil
|
|-
|Loss
|align=center| 3–3
|Emiliano Sordi
| Submission (guillotine choke)
| Jungle Fight 35
| 
|align=center| 1
|align=center| 0:34
| Rio de Janeiro, Brazil
|
|-
|Win
|align=center| 3–2
|Dirlei Broenstrup
| TKO (retirement)
| Jungle Fight 32
| 
|align=center| 3
|align=center| 2:46
| São Paulo, Brazil
|
|-
|Win
|align=center| 2–2
|Jackson Mora
| KO (punches)
| Jungle Fight 28
| 
|align=center| 1
|align=center| 4:28
| Rio de Janeiro, Brazil
|
|-
|Win
|align=center| 1–2
|Marcelo Cruz
| TKO (leg kicks and punches)
| Jungle Fight 26
| 
|align=center| 3
|align=center| 1:53
| São Paulo, Brazil
|
|-
|Loss
|align=center| 0–2
|Nelson Martins
| Disqualification (illegal punches)
| Jungle Fight 24
| 
|align=center| 1
|align=center| 1:58
| Rio de Janeiro, Brazil
|
|-
|Loss
|align=center| 0–1
|João Paulo Pereira
|Submission (arm-triangle choke)
| Predador FC 17
| 
|align=center| 1
|align=center| 3:34
| São Paulo, Brazil
|

See also
 List of current PFL fighters
 List of male mixed martial artists

References

External links
 

Living people
1989 births
Brazilian male mixed martial artists
Heavyweight mixed martial artists
PFL male fighters
People from Jaú